Self-contradiction or self-contradictory can refer to:

 Auto-antonym, a word with multiple meanings of which one is the reverse of another
 Formal fallacy, a pattern of reasoning rendered invalid by a flaw in its logical structure
 Oxymoron, a figure of speech that juxtaposes concepts with opposing meanings within a word or phrase that creates an ostensible self-contradiction
 Paradox, a logically self-contradictory statement or a statement that runs contrary to one's expectation
 Self-refuting idea, idea or statement whose falsehood is a logical consequence of the original

See also 
 Contradiction
 Reductio ad absurdum